State Route 444 (SR 444) is a  state highway completely within Loudon County in the eastern portion of the U.S. state of Tennessee. It serves the resort community of Tellico Village, and connects the village with Lenoir City.

Route description

SR 444 begins at an intersection with SR 72. It travels to the northeast, crossing over a segment of Tellico Lake and passing through the resort community of Tellico Village, the highway passes northwest of Toqua Golf Club. After skirting along the western shore of the lake, SR 444 travels farther to the west. It curves back to the east, passing through Tanasi Golf Club. The highway then crosses over another segment of the lake and leaves Tellico Village. Then, it curves to the northeast. After a curve to the southeast, it meets its eastern terminus, an interchange with US 321/SR 73/SR 95 just southeast of Lenoir City.

History

Major intersections

See also

 List of state routes in Tennessee
 List of highways numbered 444

References

External links
 

444
Transportation in Loudon County, Tennessee